Ganbaatar is a Mongolian given name. Notable people with the name include:

 Ariunbaatar Ganbaatar (born 1988), Mongolian baritone
 Sainkhüügiin Ganbaatar (born 1970), Mongolian politician 
 Zandraa Ganbaatar, Mongolian Paralympic shooter
 A. Ganbaatar, Mongolian politician